Northern Colorado Hailstorm FC is an American professional soccer team based in Windsor, Colorado. The club was founded in 2021, and made its competitive debut in 2022. The team plays in USL League One, the third tier of the American soccer pyramid, and is owned by the Katofsky family and the Future Legends ownership group.

History

Soccer in Colorado 
There are three other professional soccer teams in the state of Colorado. Colorado Rapids play in Major League Soccer, Colorado Springs Switchbacks play in USL Championship and Colorado Rapids 2 play in MLS Next Pro.

Inaugural season 
Because USL League One had an uneven number of teams for the 2022 season, Northern Colorado played the first competitive match in its history in the U.S. Open Cup on April 6 of that year, against the Colorado Springs Switchbacks. Despite losing Irvin Parra to a red card in the 27th minute, the Hailstorm won 1–0 in extra time, with Jerry Desdunes scoring their first-ever goal in the 96th. On April 9, 2022, Ethan Vanacore-Decker scored the first league goal for the Hailstorm play during their inaugural USL League One match which finished in a 1–1 draw with Richmond Kickers. In just its fourth ever competitive match, the Hailstorm defeated Major League Soccer side Real Salt Lake away from home by a score of 1–0 on April 20, 2022, to advance to the fourth round of the U.S. Open Cup. The Hailstorm were eliminated from cup competition on May 11, 2022 by fellow League One opponents Union Omaha by a score of 2-0 in the round of 32. The Hailstorm played their first home game against North Carolina FC on June 8, 2022, after 10 games (including cup matches) on the road while awaiting a home venue in Colorado.  The game took place at Jackson Stadium, on the campus of the University of Northern Colorado, since the completion of TicketSmarter Stadium was delayed until later in 2022. The game saw Irvin Parra score the Hailstorm's first home goal in spectacular fashion, making #2 on ESPN's top ten list that evening. The Hailstorm would go on the finish the match in a 1-1 draw.

Stadium 
The team will play their home games at TicketSmarter Stadium located at the Future Legends Complex, a 118-acre multi-sport complex that is scheduled to open in 2022.  The complex is expected to have 10 baseball fields and 12 soccer pitches.  The team will share the complex with a minor-league baseball team, the Northern Colorado Owlz. The Owlz and Hailstorm "will play in a secondary location while construction concludes."

Due to construction delays, caused by an months-long investigation into the possible presence of a historical site in June 2021, the team obtained permission from the University of Northern Colorado (UNC, in Greeley, Colorado) to use their soccer facility, Jackson Stadium throughout the month of June, 2022.  Due the resumption of inter-collegiate soccer at UNC, the team then obtained permission from Colorado State University (CSU, in Fort Collins, Colorado) to use Canvas Stadium, an artificial turf college football stadium with a capacity of 40,000+ throughout the month of July, 2022.

Players and staff

Current roster

Front office and Technical staff

Record

Year-by-year

1. Top Scorer includes statistics from league matches only.

Head coach records
 Includes USL Regular Season, USL Playoffs, U.S. Open Cup. Excludes friendlies.

References 

Soccer clubs in Colorado
Association football clubs established in 2021
USL League One teams
Larimer County, Colorado
2021 establishments in Colorado